Savard is a surname. Notable people with the surname include:

 André Savard (born 1953), Canadian ice hockey player
 David Savard (born 1990), Canadian ice hockey player
 Denis Savard (born 1961), Canadian ice hockey player and coach
 Ernest Savard, Canadian stock broker
 Félix-Antoine Savard (1896-1982), Canadian priest, academic, poet, novelist, and folklorist
 Jeannine Savard, American poet
 JoJo Savard, Canadian medium, or psychic
 Marc Savard (born 1977), Canadian ice hockey player
 Pierre Savard, Canadian businessman and politician 
 Serge Savard (born 1946), Canadian ice hockey player and businessman

Places
 Savard, Ontario